Carol Montgomery Stone (February 1, 1915 – June 10, 2011) was an actress who played "Big Nose Kate", or Kate Holliday, the common-law wife of Doc Holliday, in ten episodes in the 1957–58 season of the ABC/Desilu western television series The Life and Legend of Wyatt Earp.

Biography
Stone was the daughter of actor Fred Stone. Her mother was actress Allene Crater; her sisters, Dorothy Stone and Paula Stone. The author Rex Beach is her uncle. Her middle name came from her father's longtime comedy partner David C. Montgomery. 

In 1940, she married Robert W. McCahon, son of Mr. and Mrs. Thomas J. McCahon of Brookline, Massachusetts. They divorced in 1950 and had no children.

Stone's TV debut came on January 2, 1951, when she appeared in Burlesque on CBS.

She died on June 10, 2011, aged 96.

References

External links
 
 
 Carol Montgomery Stone's obituary

1915 births
2011 deaths
People from Los Angeles
American actresses
21st-century American women